Baghijan (also Romanized as Baghījān, Baghi Jan, and Begheyjān; also known as Baqījān and Begaijān) is a village in Ravar Rural District, in the Central District of Ravar County, Kerman Province, Iran. At the 2006 census, its population was 160, in 55 families.

References 

Populated places in Ravar County